John Bernard Hoey (November 10, 1881 – November 14, 1947) was an outfielder in Major League Baseball who played from 1906 through 1908 for the Boston Americans/Red Sox. A native of Watertown, Massachusetts, he was signed by Boston out of the College of the Holy Cross.

In a three-season career, Hoey was a .232 hitter (116-for-500) with 39 runs and 35 RBI in 146 games, including 10 doubles, five triples and 13 stolen bases. He did not hit a home run. He also made 126 outfield appearances at left field (111), right (11) and center (4), committing 19 error in 218 chances for a collective .913 fielding percentage. 
 
Hoey died in Waterbury, Connecticut at age 66.

Sources
Baseball Reference
Retrosheet

Boston Americans players
Boston Red Sox players
Major League Baseball outfielders
College of the Holy Cross alumni
Baseball players from Massachusetts
1881 births
1947 deaths
Minor league baseball managers
Toronto Maple Leafs (International League) players
Trenton Tigers players
Little Rock Travelers players
St. Paul Saints (AA) players
Waterbury Finnegans players
New Britain Perfectos players
Waterbury Spuds players
Hartford Senators players
Meriden Hopes players
Fitchburg Burghers players
Lynn Pirates players
People from Watertown, Massachusetts
Sportspeople from Middlesex County, Massachusetts